Graz Cathedral, also called St. Giles' Cathedral, is the cathedral church in the Austrian city of Graz, dedicated to Saint Giles.  It is the seat of the bishop of the Steiermark diocese from 1786, called the Diocese of Graz-Seckau.

The church was built as church of the Court (hofkirche) in 1438-62 by Friederick III in the Gothic architecture and later (1577-1773) officiated by the Jesuits that made some alterations in Baroque style. 
Nearby is Mausoleum of Emperor Ferdinand II.

References

External links
 
 Roman Catholic Diocese of Graz-Seckau (in German)

Buildings and structures in Graz
Roman Catholic churches in Graz
Gothic architecture in Austria
Roman Catholic cathedrals in Austria
Tourist attractions in Graz